Kent Mikael Appelgren (born 15 October 1961 in Stockholm) is a Swedish former table tennis player.

Table tennis career
He was 4-times World Champion, 9-times European Champion, 2-times Europe Top-12 winner, and World Cup winner. He also won an English Open title.

He is left-handed and is known for his ability to play well far away from the table. This particular style became known over the years as 'appleing'. 

Applegren coaches Swedish first league team Ängby/Spårvägen and was present when Jan-Ove Waldner ended his career on 11 February 2016.

Career

Wermlandsföreningen (??-1974)
Stockholms Spårvägars GoIF (1974–1980)
Reutlingen, Germany (1980–1986)
Ängby SK (1986–1996)
Bad Honnef, Germany (1996–1997)
TTK Würzburger Hofbräu, Germany (1997–1998, 1998–1999)
Ängby SK (1999–2008)
Stockholms Spårvägars GoIF (2008-??)

See also
 List of table tennis players
 List of World Table Tennis Championships medalists

References

External links

Mikael Appelgren vs. Jan-Ove Waldner - 1990 U.S. Open Table Tennis Championships Video
 Appelgren coach
 Appelgren coach when Waldner ended career

1961 births
Living people
Sportspeople from Stockholm
Swedish male table tennis players
Swedish table tennis coaches
Table tennis players at the 1988 Summer Olympics
Table tennis players at the 1992 Summer Olympics
Olympic table tennis players of Sweden